Protoreodon ("first Oreodon") was a genus of agriochoerid merycoidodontoid from California, Texas, Utah and Wyoming.<ref name="fossilworksa"/

References 

Oreodonts
Prehistoric even-toed ungulate genera
Paleogene mammals of North America